WYFC (95.3 FM) is an affiliate of the Bible Broadcasting Network in Clinton, Tennessee, broadcasting to the Knoxville, Tennessee, area. The station was a former commercial Contemporary Hit Radio station (WTNZ-FM Power 95.3) from 1986 to 1989.

References

External links

Bible Broadcasting Network
YFC
1986 establishments in Tennessee
Radio stations established in 1986
Anderson County, Tennessee